Emmanuel Yousif better known as Ammo Yousif (born 1 July 1945) is a former Iraqi football forward who played for Iraq in the 1972 AFC Asian Cup. He played for the national team between 1968 and 1975.

He scored the only goal for Iraq at the 1972 AFC Asian Cup against Thailand.

Career statistics

International goals
Scores and results list Iraq's goal tally first.

References

1945 births
Living people
Iraqi footballers
Iraq international footballers
1972 AFC Asian Cup players
Association football forwards
Iraqi Christians
Iraqi Assyrian people